Ian Wiley (born 5 May 1968 in Chapelizod) is an Irish slalom canoeist who competed at the international level from 1986 to 2000.

He is the European Champion in K1 from 1996 in Augsburg. Competing in three Summer Olympics, he earned his best finish of fifth in the K1 event in Atlanta in 1996.

Ian Wiley has 4 children.

World Cup individual podiums

References

1968 births
Canoeists at the 1992 Summer Olympics
Canoeists at the 1996 Summer Olympics
Canoeists at the 2000 Summer Olympics
Irish male canoeists
Living people
Olympic canoeists of Ireland